Robert Danton Reischauer (born 1941) is an economist and was one of the two public trustees of the Medicare and Social Security Trust Fund.  He is a nationally known expert on the federal budget, health reform, Medicare, and Social Security. Most recently (2000–2012) he served as president of the Urban Institute, a think tank based in Washington, D.C.  He is the son of Japan scholar Edwin O. Reischauer.

Career

Congressional Budget Office
Reischauer was director of the Congressional Budget Office (CBO) from 1989 to 1995. He helped Alice Rivlin set up the CBO in 1975, and served as the assistant director for human resources and its deputy director between 1977 and 1981.

Urban Institute and Brookings Institution
Reischauer served as senior vice president of the Urban Institute from 1981 to 1986. He was a senior fellow of economic studies at the Brookings Institution from 1986 to 1989 and from 1995 to 2000. He began his tenure as the second president of the Urban Institute in February 2000 and left that role in 2012.

Board Memberships and Expert Commentary
Reischauer serves on the boards of several educational and nonprofit organizations, including the Committee for a Responsible Federal Budget. He was a member of the Medicare Payment Advisory Commission from 2000 to 2009 and was its vice chair from 2001 to 2008. He frequently contributes to the opinion pages of the nation's major newspapers, comments on public policy developments on radio and television, and testifies before congressional committees.

Reischauer was also Senior Fellow of the Harvard Corporation from 2010 to 2014.

Education
Reischauer attended Harvard University (A.B. in political science) and Columbia University (M.I.A. in International Relations and Ph.D. in economics).

Bibliography

References

External links

21st-century American economists
Living people
School of International and Public Affairs, Columbia University alumni
Directors of the Congressional Budget Office
1941 births
Harvard University alumni
Center on Budget and Policy Priorities
Urban Institute people
Members of the National Academy of Medicine